The 1974 football season was São Paulo's 45th season since club's existence.

Statistics

Scorers

Overall

{|class="wikitable"
|-
|Games played || 67 (26 Campeonato Paulista, 13 Copa Libertadores, 24 Campeonato Brasileiro, 4 Friendly match)
|-
|Games won || 31 (12 Campeonato Paulista, 8 Copa Libertadores, 8 Campeonato Brasileiro, 3 Friendly match)
|-
|Games drawn || 27 (10 Campeonato Paulista, 3 Copa Libertadores, 13 Campeonato Brasileiro, 1 Friendly match)
|-
|Games lost || 9 (4 Campeonato Paulista, 2 Copa Libertadores, 3 Campeonato Brasileiro, 0 Friendly match)
|-
|Goals scored || 87
|-
|Goals conceded || 42
|-
|Goal difference || +45
|-
|Best result || 5–0 (H) v Jorge Wilstermann - Copa Libertadores - 1974.05.08
|-
|Worst result || 0–3 (A) v Saad - Campeonato Paulista - 1974.09.21
|-
|Most appearances || 
|-
|Top scorer || Mirandinha (16)
|-

Friendlies

Official competitions

Campeonato Brasileiro

Record

Copa Libertadores

Record

Campeonato Paulista

Record

External links
official website 

Association football clubs 1974 season
1974
1974 in Brazilian football